Ankara University is a public university in Ankara, the capital city of Turkey. It was the first higher education institution founded in Turkey after the formation of the republic in 1923.

The university has 40 vocational programs, 120 undergraduate programs and 110 graduate programs.

History

Ankara University was founded by Mustafa Kemal Atatürk, the first president of Turkey.

Ankara University faculties are:
 Faculty of Political Science (1859). The faculty was founded as a community college in 1859 and has undergone series of changes since the establishment. It was named Mekteb-i Mulkiye-i Sahane under the Ministry of Internal Affairs but in 1918 the name was changed to Mekteb-i Mulkiye under the Ministry of Education. After the founding of the Republic, at the request of Atatürk, the school was moved to Ankara, and named the School of Political Science. On March 23, 1950, the school was placed under Ankara University as the "Faculty of Political Science".
 Public Administration, Labor Economics, Business Administration and International Relations.
 Faculty of Law (1925)
 Faculty of Language, History and Geography (1935)
 Faculty of Science (1943)
 Faculty of Medicine (1945)
 Faculty of Veterinary Medicine (1842)
 The School of Divinity was founded in 1949
 The School of Pharmacy in 1960
 The School of Dentistry (1963) which became a faculty in 1977
 Faculty of Educational Sciences in 1965
 Faculty of Communication also known as İLEF was established in 1965
 The Çankırı Faculty of Forestry and the Health Education Faculty were opened to education in 1996.
 Faculty of Fine Arts in 2015.Anasayfa
 Faculty of Applied Sciences in 2015.
 Faculty of Open and Distance Education (2020)
School are:
 The Institute of Technology for Agriculture founded 1933,
 The School of Language and History – Geography founded 1935,
 The School of Political Sciences (that trained public administrators under the name of Mekteb-i Mülkiye since 1859, and which was later on moved to Ankara) in 1936 upon the directive of Atatürk.
 The Schools of Medicine and of Science were established in the 1940s.

Research, application and education centers
There are 41 Research, Application and Education centers in Ankara University. 
 The Turkish and Foreign Languages Research and Application Center, TÖMER, was established in 1984. By 2014, TÖMER has reached 11 branches all over Turkey and the central office in Ankara. Languages taught in TÖMER include Turkish, English, German, French, Spanish, Italian, Russian, Japanese, Modern Greek, Dutch, Bulgarian, Chinese, Ottoman language, Arabic, Polish and languages of the Central Asian Turkic Republics. This list of languages constantly changes.
Ankara University Kreiken Observatory. Construction of the observatory started in 1959. In 1963 it was officially opened at the International Astronomy Conference. Along with scientific activities the observatory holds educational events for children, school children and students. When important astronomical events are taking place the observatory gives access to the observations to the public.
 Ankara University Women Issues Research and Application Center (KASAUM) organizes research and educational programmes which are directed at scrutinizing and discussing women roles and problems in society as well as gender issues. In order to support and develop the research "Women research" master programme was opened in 1996.
 Ankara University Small Entrepreneurship Research and Application Center (KIGAUM) runs research on problems connected to starting and maintaining small entrepreneurship activities. The center organizes educational programmes for academicians and entrepreneurs, sets up partnerships with local and international research and application centers, publishes articles and books and informes academics, business, government structures and wide public on the topics linked to entrepreneurship.
 Ankara University Distance Education Center provides the opportunity of getting college or higher education as well as taking part in courses distantly.
 Ankara University Center of Excellence of Superconductivity Research (CESUR) works on superconductivity research, focusing on superconducting wires, tapes and thin films which can be used in application of practical superconductivity technologies. Main attention is paid to research of MgB2, BSCCO and YBCO materials.
 Ankara University European Research Center (ATAUM) is an interdisciplinary research and training center founded to promote knowledge and understanding of the European Union (EU), its member states, and Turkey-EU relations. It was founded in 1987, the year in which Turkey applied to the European Community for membership.
 The Ankara University Center of Earthquakes Research objective is to hold independent research of seismic activity in Ankara and its surroundings as well as in Turkey as a whole.
 Ankara University Psychiatric Crisis Research and Application Center (PKUAM) was established on October 27, 1987. The center organizes research in the sphere of psychiatric crises and their prevention, suicide and its prevention. PKUAM is a reference agent of World Health Organization.
 Ankara University Brain Research Center (AU-BRC) was founded on May 21, 2009. It organizes research and scientific events connected to the studies of human brain. Scientists from such fields as linguistics, psychiatry, neurology, physiology and electrical engineering are working here together.
 Ankara University Latin American Research and Application Center (LAMER) was opened in 2009 and is engaged in research on economic, political, social and cultural issues taken place in Latin America. Researchers of the Center scrutinize Latin America's development and analyze the possibility of implication of Latin American countries' positive experience in Turkey. Other goals of LAMER are to educate specialists in Latin American problems; gather documents, books, etc. in the field of the research; hold conferences and educating events and establish and maintain relationships with consolates, museums, commercial organizations, etc. from and working with Latin American region.
 Ankara University Center of Research of Child's Culture (ÇOKAUM) was founded in 1994 by Prof.Dr. Bekir Onur. The center unites specialists from the spheres of psychology, sociology, anthropology, history, communication, health, etc. ÇOKAUM's objectives are to organize and hold researches in the field of child's culture; organize and participate in conferences and other academic events in Turkey and abroad; inform specialists and public about child's culture and results of researches in this area.
 Ankara University Center of Research of South Eastern Europe (GAMER) was founded in 2009. Geographically South Eastern Europe is a district placed between the Carpathians, the Black Sea, the Aegean Sea and the Mediterranean Sea and the Ionian Sea and Adriatic Sea. GAMER is organizing and holding research and educational projects on the topics connected with the cultural, historical, academic, economic, etc. aspects of the development of South Eastern Europe. The center provides consultancy on related matters and publishes a scientific journal.
 Ankara University Center of Research of Turkish Geography (TÜCAUM) started work in 1990. Its goals are to organize and hold research of Turkish geography; to search for, gather and keep data from researches of Turkish geography made in other countries; to support projects of Turkish researches on the related topics and to create and maintain an archive of different materials connected to Turkey and its geography.
 Ankara University Research and Application Center on Political Psychology (POLPAUM).
 Ankara University Center of Environmental Science.
 Ankara University Center of Old Age Research and Application Center (YASAM) organizes research and projects connected to problems of aging, and older people welfare. The center publishes and takes part in publications on the topics of social, economic, health and psychologic conditions of life of people of old age.

International Perspective 

The Department of Japanese Language and Literature was awarded the Japanese Foreign Minister’s Commendation for their contributions to promotion of Japanese language education in Turkey on December 1, 2020.

Notable members

Faculty 

 Hasan Reşit Tankut, history

Notable alumni

 Bülent Arınç - politician and former speaker of the parliament
 Tomris Bakır - archaeologist
 Deniz Baykal - politician and party leader
 Ataol Behramoglu - poet and university lecturer
 Akın Birdal - politician
 Osman Birsen - former CEO of Istanbul Stock Exchange
 Deniz Çakır - actor
 Cengiz Çandar - journalist
 Mevlüt Çavuşoğlu - diplomat and politician; current Minister of Foreign Affairs of Turkey
 Mustafa Ceceli - singer
 Hikmet Çetin - former speaker of the parliament
 Mehmet Culum - novelist
 Can Dündar - journalist
 İsmail Hakkı Duru - theoretical physicist
 Muammer Güler - Governor of Istanbul
 Aydın Güven Gürkan - academician, socialist party leader
 Ekmeleddin Ihsanoglu - Secretary-General of the Organisation of the Islamic Conference
 Erdal İnönü -academic and politician
 Mustafa Kalemli - physician and politician
 Ahmet Taner Kışlalı - intellectual and former government minister
 Hayri Kozakçıoğlu - Province governor and politician
 Ferit Melen - former prime minister
 Adnan Menderes - former prime minister
 Murathan Mungan - author
 Tahsin Özgüç - archaeologist
 Ahmet Necdet Sezer - President of Turkey (2000–2007)
 Cemal Süreya - poet
 Murat Karayalçın - former Minister for Foreign Affairs; former Deputy Prime Minister and former Mayor of Ankara
 Sedat Laçiner - IR lecturer, Rector, columnist and Director of International Strategic Research Organization (USAK)
 Hasan Celal Güzel - former Minister of National Education
 Mehmet Hakkı Suçin - Arabist
 Selahattin Demirtaş - Politician
 İlber Ortaylı - Historian
 Metin Feyzioğlu - Lawyer
 Halil İnalcık - Historian
 İhsan Doğramacı - doctor
 Ahmet Taner Kışlalı - Politician
 Engin Akyürek - cinema player 
 Mehmet Görmez-Professor
 Melih Gökçek-Politician
 Mehmet Şimşek-Politician
 Beşir Atalay-Politician
Abdullah Öcalan (born 1946), Kurdistan Workers' Party leader and political thinker
 Doğu Perinçek-Politician
 Mehmet Haberal-Doctor-Başkent University Rector
 Cüneyt Özdemir-Journalist
 Mithat Sancar-Politician
 Metin Altıok-Poet
 Ahmed Arif-Poet
 Ayşenur İslam-Politician
 Selma Aliye Kavaf-Politician
 Sezai Karakoç-Author-Poet
 Suat Kılıç-Politician
 Ece Temelkuran-Author
 Mehmet Bekaroğlu - doctor-politician
 Çetin Altan-Writer
 Sırrı Süreyya Önder-Politician
 Haluk Koç-Politician
 Mustafa Kamalak-Saadet Party Leader
 Merve Kavakçı
 Muammer Güler-Politician
 Kartal Tibet-Senarist
 Mehmet Mehdi Eker-Politician
 Sema Ramazanoğlu-Politician
 Naci Bostancı-Politician
 Sadullah Ergin-Politician
 Emine Ülker Tarhan-Politician
 Abdülkadir Aksu-Politician
 Mustafa Elitaş-Politician
 Altan Erkekli-Theatre Player
 Adalet Ağaoğlu-Author
 Bülent Ecevit-Politician
Hakim Muhammad Said - medical researcher, scholar, philanthropist, and a Governor of Sindh Province, Pakistan from 1993 until 1996
Abdüllatif Şener - Leader of political party -former deputy prime-minister - former minister of finance
 Adnan Sezgin - former soccer player and current businessman
 Tuluhan Tekelioğlu, journalist, writer, documentary film producer
 Tülay Tuğcu - former Chief Justice of the Supreme Court of Turkey
 Hamdi Ulukaya - owner, founder, Chairman, and CEO of Chobani
 Gazi Yaşargil-Doctor 
 Muhsin Yazıcıoğlu-Politician
 Mesut Yılmaz - Politician
 Halit Ergün
 Uğur Aslan 
 Hamdi Ulukaya - owner, founder, Chairman, and CEO of Chobani
 Gazi Yaşargil-Doctor 
 Selda Bağcan
 Ali Birinci
 Aslı Şafak
 Muhsin Yazıcıoğlu-Politician
 Mesut Yılmaz - Politician
 Barış Falay
 List of universities in Ankara
 List of universities in Turkey
 Ankara University, Law School
 Faculty of Political Science, Ankara University
 Ankara University Observatory
</div>

References

External links

Ankara University website

 
Educational institutions established in 1946
1946 establishments in Turkey